Robertsiella is a genus of freshwater snails which have a gill and an operculum, gastropod mollusks or micromollusks in the family Pomatiopsidae.

Distribution 
The distribution of Robertsiella includes Malaysia.

Species
Species within the genus Robertsiella include:
 Robertsiella gismanni Davis & Greer, 1980
 Robertsiella kaporensis Davis & Greer, 1980
 Robertsiella silvicola Attwood, Lokman & Ong, 2005

References

External links 

Pomatiopsidae